Belinda Thompson (born 3 May 1956) is a British former professional tennis player.

Thompson, a British junior champion, is a native of Manchester and was named Stockport Sports Personality of the Year in 1976. She appeared twice in the second round of the Wimbledon Championships.

References

External links
 
 

1956 births
Living people
British female tennis players
English female tennis players
Tennis people from Greater Manchester